This article is about the particular significance of the year 1788 to Wales and its people.

Incumbents
Lord Lieutenant of Anglesey - Henry Paget 
Lord Lieutenant of Brecknockshire and Monmouthshire – Henry Somerset, 5th Duke of Beaufort
Lord Lieutenant of Caernarvonshire - Thomas Bulkeley, 7th Viscount Bulkeley
Lord Lieutenant of Cardiganshire – Wilmot Vaughan, 1st Earl of Lisburne
Lord Lieutenant of Carmarthenshire – John Vaughan  
Lord Lieutenant of Denbighshire - Richard Myddelton  
Lord Lieutenant of Flintshire - Sir Roger Mostyn, 5th Baronet 
Lord Lieutenant of Glamorgan – John Stuart, Lord Mountstuart
Lord Lieutenant of Merionethshire - Sir Watkin Williams-Wynn, 4th Baronet
Lord Lieutenant of Montgomeryshire – George Herbert, 2nd Earl of Powis
Lord Lieutenant of Pembrokeshire – Richard Philipps, 1st Baron Milford
Lord Lieutenant of Radnorshire – Edward Harley, 4th Earl of Oxford and Earl Mortimer

Bishop of Bangor – John Warren
Bishop of Llandaff – Richard Watson
Bishop of St Asaph – Jonathan Shipley (until 6 December)
Bishop of St Davids – Edward Smallwell (until 15 April); Samuel Horsley (from 11 May)

Events
18 March – Great Sessions at Wrexham hear a graveyard dispute between the "Old" and "New" chapels at Llanuwchllyn.
4 June – Lloyd Kenyon, 1st Baron Kenyon, becomes Chief Justice of the King's Bench.
date unknown – Architect John Nash, during his "Welsh interlude", designs the stable block at Plas Llanstephan

Arts and literature

New books
Robert Jones (Robert ab Ioan) – Drych i'r Anllythrennog
Nicholas Owen – British Remains.
John Roberts (Siôn Robert Lewis) – Yr Athrofa Rad
Hester Lynch Piozzi – Letters to and from the late Samuel Johnson

Births
12 February – William Williams, MP (died 1865)
5 October – John Montgomery Traherne, antiquary (died 1860).
28 December – Griffith Davies, actuary (died 1855)
date unknown – Mary Morgan, servant hanged for killing her newborn child (died 1805)
probable – Elijah Waring, English-born preacher, editor and writer (died 1857)

Deaths
30 January – Charles Edward Stuart, last Stuart claimant to the title of Prince of Wales, 67
25 May – David Thomas, noted bone-setter, 49
4 August – Evan Evans (Ieuan Fardd or Ieuan Brydydd Hir), priest and poet, 57
6 December – Jonathan Shipley, Bishop of Llandaff and St Asaph, 74
date unknown – David Evans, canon of St Asaph, writer and musician, 82–83

References

Wales
Wales